Duwayr Taha (also spelled Dweir Taha or Dwerta) is a village in northwestern Syria, administratively part of the Tartus Governorate. It is situated near the Mediterranean coast. According to the Syria Central Bureau of Statistics (CBS), Duwayr Taha had a population of 1,714 in the 2004 census. Its inhabitants are predominantly Greek Orthodox Christians.

History
Duwayr Taha became part of the municipality of al-Sawda in 1975, but later gained independent municipal status.

References

Populated places in Tartus District
Eastern Orthodox Christian communities in Syria